Ranjha (or Ranjhan) may refer to:
Heer Ranjha, one of several popular tragic romances of Punjab
Ranjha clan, one of the clans of Jat people
Ranjhan Mera Yaar, 1984 Indian film
Ranjha Refugee, 2018 Indian film
Khalid Ranjha, former Pakistani law minister 
Mohsin Shahnawaz Ranjha, member of the National Assembly of Pakistan

See also
 Heer Ranjha (disambiguation)
 Heer (disambiguation)
 Ranjana (disambiguation)